Abrit Nunatak is the rocky hill rising to 556 m east of Laclavère Plateau on Trinity Peninsula in Graham Land, Antarctica.  It is overlooking Mott Snowfield to the north and Retizhe Cove to the southeast.

The nunatak is named after the settlement of Abrit in Northeastern Bulgaria.

Location
German-British mapping in 1996.

Maps
 Trinity Peninsula. Scale 1:250000 topographic map No. 5697. Institut für Angewandte Geodäsie and British Antarctic Survey, 1996.
 Antarctic Digital Database (ADD). Scale 1:250000 topographic map of Antarctica. Scientific Committee on Antarctic Research (SCAR). Since 1993, regularly upgraded and updated.

Notes

References
 Abrit Nunatak. SCAR Composite Antarctic Gazetteer
 Bulgarian Antarctic Gazetteer. Antarctic Place-names Commission. (details in Bulgarian, basic data in English)

External links
 Abrit Nunatak. Copernix satellite image

Nunataks of Trinity Peninsula
Bulgaria and the Antarctic